Unification or unification theory may refer to:

Computer science 
 Unification (computer science), the act of identifying two terms with a suitable substitution
 Unification (graph theory), the computation of the most general graph that subsumes one or more argument graphs (if such a graph exists)
 Han unification, an orthographic issue dealt with by Unicode

Physics 
 Unification (physics) of the observable fundamental phenomena of nature is one of the primary goals of physics
 Grand Unified Theory, a model in particle physics
 Unified field theory, a type of field theory

Popular culture 
 Unification (album), a 1998 album by the band Iron Savior
 "Unification" (Star Trek: The Next Generation), a two-part episode of Star Trek: The Next Generation

Sport 
 The act of producing an undisputed championship in boxing
 The act of producing an undisputed championship in professional wrestling

Other uses 
 Semantic unification, in philosophy, linguistics, and computer science
 Unification Church or Movement, a spiritual movement founded in Korea
 Unification or re-unification of sovereign states, see political union

See also 
 Unification Church
 Unionism (disambiguation)
 Unified (disambiguation)